Marco Antonio Quirino, O. Cruc. or Marco Sebastianus Quirino (born 1581) was a Roman Catholic prelate who served as Archbishop of Naxos (1622–1625).

Biography
Marco Antonio Quirino was born in 1581 and ordained a priest in the Canons Regular of the Order of the Holy Cross.
On 24 January 1622, he was appointed during the papacy of Pope Paul V as Archbishop of Naxos.
On 13 March 1622, he was consecrated bishop by Giovanni Garzia Mellini, Cardinal-Priest of Santi Quattro Coronati with Tommaso Ximenes, Bishop of Fiesole, and Pierre François Maletti, Bishop of Nice, serving as co-consecrators. 
He served as Archbishop of Naxos until his resignation in 1625.

References

External links and additional sources
 (for Chronology of Bishops) 
 (for Chronology of Bishops) 

17th-century Roman Catholic bishops in the Republic of Venice
Bishops appointed by Pope Paul V
1581 births
1625 deaths
Roman Catholic archbishops of Naxos